Neotegenaria is a genus of South American funnel weavers containing the single species, Neotegenaria agelenoides. It was  first described by V. D. Roth in 1967, and has only been found in Guyana.

References

External links

Agelenidae
Monotypic Araneomorphae genera
Spiders of South America